Six ships of the Royal Navy have been named HMS Narcissus after the Narcissus of mythology, or after the Narcissi flowers.

  was a 20-gun post ship launched in 1781 and wrecked in 1796.
  was a 32-gun fifth-rate frigate launched in 1801, converted to a convict ship after 1823, and sold 1837.
 A 28-gun sixth-rate Narcissus of 601 tons was ordered in 1846 but cancelled in 1848.
 A 50-gun fourth-rate Narcissus of 1,996 tons was ordered in 1849 and cancelled in 1857.
  was a wooden-hulled screw frigate in service from 1859 to 1883.
  was an armoured cruiser launched in 1886 and sold in 1906.
  was an  sloop in use from 1915 to 1922.
  was a  launched in 1941 and sold 1946.

Royal Navy ship names